Pak Jong-chol (박정철) may refer to:
 Pak Jong-chol (boxer)
 Pak Jong-chol (judoka)

See also
 Bak Jong-cheol (박종철), South Korean democracy movement activist